Golubev (masculine) or Golubeva (feminine) is a Russian last name, derived from the Russian word  (golub, "pigeon"). It may refer to:
Aleksandr Titovich Golubev (1936-2020), Soviet and Russian intelligence officer
Aleksandr Golubev (footballer) (b. 1986), Russian association football player
Aleksandr Golubev (speed skater) (b. 1972), Russian speed skater
Andrey Golubev (b. 1987), Kazakh tennis player
Dmitry Golubev (disambiguation), several people
Evgeny Golubev (1910–1988), Russian composer
 (1919–2005), Soviet army officer and Hero of the Soviet Union
Ivan Golubev (1841–1918), Russian politician
Ivan Andreevich Golubev, Russian name of Wang Ming, an early Communist Party of China leader and 28 Bolsheviks member
Kirill Golubev (b. 1974), Soviet and Russian ice hockey player
Konstantin Golubev (1896 – 1956), Soviet general and army commander during World War II
Sergey Golubev (officer) (1923–?), Soviet army officer, Hero of the Soviet Union and consultant on the assassination of Georgy Markov
Sergey Golubev (b. 1978), Russian bobsledder
Valery Golubev (b. 1952), Russian politician and businessman
Vasily Golubev (painter) (1925–1985), Soviet, Russian painter
Vasily Golubev (politician) (born 1957), governor of Rostov Oblast, Russia
Viktor Golubev (1916–1945), Soviet aircraft pilot and twice Hero of the Soviet Union
 (1884–1954), Soviet mathematician and mechanic
Vladimir Golubev (footballer) (1950–2022), Soviet association football player and coach

See also
Cody Goloubef (born 1989), Canadian hockey player

Russian-language surnames